Manchester North West was one of six single-member Parliamentary constituencies created in 1885 by the division of the three-member Parliamentary Borough of Manchester under the Redistribution of Seats Act 1885. Its first MP, William Houldsworth, had previously sat for Manchester. It was abolished in 1918.

Winston Churchill won the seat at the 1906 general election, but lost it at the 1908 by-election required at that time on his promotion to the Cabinet (he instead returned to Parliament for Dundee). In 1910, Bonar Law challenged Churchill to run against him here, and promised "he would welcome him and they would have a lively time". Bonar Law suggested that the loser should stay out of the next parliament (The Times). Churchill declined. In the event Bonar Law lost to the sitting MP, Sir George Kemp.

Kemp resigned the seat in July 1912, ostensibly to concentrate on his business interests, but he was known to disagree with the Home Rule Bill (The Times).

Boundaries
The Municipal Borough of Manchester wards of Collegiate, Exchange, Oxford, St Ann's, St Clement's, St James's, and St John's, and the civil parish of Cheetham.

Members of Parliament

Elections

Elections in the 1880s

Elections in the 1890s

Elections in the 1900s

Elections in the 1910s

General Election 1914–15:

Another General Election was required to take place before the end of 1915. The political parties had been making preparations for an election to take place and by July 1914, the following candidates had been selected; 
Unionist: John Randles
Liberal: John Simon

References

Sources 
Election Results:
https://web.archive.org/web/20060520143104/http://www.manchester.gov.uk/elections/archive/gen1900.htm
https://web.archive.org/web/20060520143047/http://www.manchester.gov.uk/elections/archive/gen1945.htm
Dan Irving:
http://debs.indstate.edu/s6883s63_1911.pdf
https://web.archive.org/web/20040828173431/http://www.modjourn.brown.edu/mjp/NAVall/Nav2/NAV0226.pdf
Bonar Law versus Churchill:
"The Manchester Contest", The Times, 29 November 1910.  Retrieved online 21 March 2006.
Resgnation of Kemp:
"Another by-election", The Times, 26 July 1912.  Retrieved online 22 March 2006.

Parliamentary constituencies in North West England (historic)
Constituencies of the Parliament of the United Kingdom established in 1885
Constituencies of the Parliament of the United Kingdom disestablished in 1918